Erkhemsaikhany Davaajargal (born 19 May 1969) is a Mongolian long-distance runner. She competed in the women's marathon at the 1996 Summer Olympics.

References

External links
 

1969 births
Living people
Athletes (track and field) at the 1996 Summer Olympics
Mongolian female long-distance runners
Mongolian female marathon runners
Olympic athletes of Mongolia
Place of birth missing (living people)
20th-century Mongolian women